Farhat Ishtiaq (born June 23, 1980), is a Pakistani writer, author and screenwriter. She is best known for her romantic novels Humsafar, Mata-e-Jaan Hai Tu, Diyar-e-Dil, Dil se Nikle Hain jo Lafz and Woh Jo Qarz Rakhty Thay Jaan Per. She mostly focuses on Pakistani society.

Background
Ishtiaq has a masters degree in civil engineering. She made a choice to give up engineering in 2005 and devote herself to writing.

Publications

Novels, books and short stories

 Humsafar
 Mata-e-Jaan Hai Tu
 Mere Humdum Mere Dost
 Diyar-e-Dil
 Bin Roye Ansoo
 Jo Bache Hain Sang Samait Lo
 Woh jo Qarz Rakhtay thay
 Woh Yakeen ka Naya Safar
 Safar ki Shaam
 Dil Say Niklay Hain jo Lafz
 Kuchh Pagal Pagal Sai
 Tum Hansti Achhi Lagti Ho
 Junoon Tha Kay Justujoo
 Khushboo Badal Chaand Hawa
 Abhi Kuchh Din Lagain Gai
 Mosam e Gul
 Aap Apnay Daam Mein
 Woh Ek Aisa Shajar Ho

Screenplays
 Humsafar (2011)
 Mata-e-Jaan Hai Tu (2012)
 Rehaai (2013)
 Mere Humdum Mere Dost (2014)
 Dayar-e-Dil (2015)
 Udaari  (2016) 
 Bin Roye (2016)
 Yaqeen Ka Safar (2017)
 Yeh Dil Mera 2019

Translations
Farhat Ishtiaq published the Hindi Edition of her Famous Novel Woh Yakeen Ka Naya Safar on Amazon. She has also Published Roman Urdu Edition of her short story Rait se But na Bana.

Filmography
 Bin Roye (2015)
 Parwaaz Hay Junoon (2018)

Awards and achievements

 Hum Honorary Phenomenal Serial Award Best Writer Award for Phenomenal Serial Humsafar (1st Hum Awards 2013)
 Best Writer Diyar e Dil (4th Hum Awards 2016)
 Best Writer for Udaari (5th Hum Awards 2017)

Lux Style Awards

Controversially she was never nominated for her most successful drama to date Humsafar.

References

External links
 Profile of Farhat Ishtiaq (The queen of love)
 Farhat Ishtiaq Says Goodbye To Diyar-e-Dil
 Pride of Pakistan: Farhat Ishtiaq
 A look back at the journey of Yakeen Ka Safar
 Farhat Ishtiaq : Official Website
 Farhat Ishtiaq on Twitter
 Official Youtube Channel of Farhat Ishtiaq

 
Pakistani women writers
1980 births
Living people
Pakistani dramatists and playwrights
Pakistani screenwriters
Writers from Karachi
Pakistani novelists
Pakistani women novelists